Joint Staff of the Islamic Republic of Iran Army, acronymed SEMAJA, is the chief of staff of the Islamic Republic of Iran Army, the conventional military of Iran, with an aim to coordinate its four military branches. The Joint Staff has Central Provost and University of Command and Staff under control.

Structure reform 
From 1921 to 1998, "Chairman of Chief of Staff" was the highest-ranking position within the Artesh, however after the newly established office "Commander-in-Chief of Artesh" position was founded in 1998, the former position was deposed as a decision-making position and became the coordinator deputy of the Chief Commander. The position is currently held by Rear admiral Habibollah Sayyari, who is second-in-command and deputy of Major general Abdolrahim Mousavi.

List of chiefs

See also 
 List of commanders of the Islamic Revolutionary Guard Corps
 Islamic Revolutionary Guard Corps Joint Staff

References 

Iran 3
Islamic Republic of Iran Army